Nagoya Maru was a Japanese cargo steamship that was built in Nagasaki in 1932. In the Second World War the Imperial Japanese Navy used her first as a submarine depot ship and then to transport aircraft. A United States Navy submarine sank her in 1944.

Building
Ishihara Sangyo Kaiun Goshi Kaisha (ISK) is a Japanese company that had mines in Malaya and operated a fleet of cargo ships. In 1932 it had a pair of sister ships built by different Japanese shipyards. Harima Shipbuilding and Engineering Co Ltd built Johore Maru at Harima, and Mitsubishi Zosen Kaisha Ltd built Nagoya Maru at Nagasaki. The pair were almost identical in design and dimensions.

Her single screw was driven by two engines. Her main engine was a three-cylinder triple expansion engine. Exhaust steam from its low pressure cylinder powered an exhaust steam turbine, which drove the same propeller shaft via a hydraulic coupling and double reduction gearing.

Owners
ISK registered both ships at Fuchū. Nagoya Marus wireless telegraph call sign was JJDE.

In 1935, Nanyo Kaiun KK acquired both Johore Maru and Nagoya Maru. It registered both ships in Tokyo.

War service
In 1941 the Imperial Japanese Army requisitioned Johore Maru and the Navy requisitioned Nagoya Maru. The Navy had Nagoya Maru converted into a submarine depot ship. In 1942 Nagoya Maru was converted again, to transport aircraft. Nagoya Maru was armed with six 15 cm/45 41st Year Type guns, plus two pairs of Type 93 heavy machine guns on dual mountings.

In October 1943 the submarine  sank Johore Maru in the Pacific Ocean northwest of the Bismarck Archipelago.

On 31 December 1943, the submarine  sighted a convoy off the Japanese coast that included Nagoya Maru. The next day, 1 January 1944, Herring sank Nagoya Maru by torpedo off the island of Aogashima at position , killing 110 passengers and one member of the ship's crew. The destroyer  counter-attacked, but without success.

References

Bibliography

1932 ships
Maritime incidents in January 1944
Ships sunk by American submarines
Shipwrecks of Japan
Steamships of Japan
World War II merchant ships of Japan
World War II shipwrecks in the Pacific Ocean